Healthcare in New Orleans includes a combination of hospitals, clinics, and other organization for the residents of New Orleans, Louisiana.

History

L’Hospital des Pauvres de la Charite was opened in 1736 as a charitable institution and was a modest operation then located on the corner of Chartres and Bienville streets.  This institution later evolved into Charity Hospital, located on Tulane Avenue, which was constructed in 1939; at the time, it was the second largest hospital in the United States.  Charity Hospital was closed in 2005 after significant damage was caused by Hurricane Katrina.  University Medical Center New Orleans was opened in 2015 as a partial replacement for Charity Hospital and other closed or deprecated institutions within the city.

Hospitals
Children's Hospital of New Orleans
Medical Center of Louisiana at New Orleans
Ochsner Baptist Medical Center
Ochsner Medical Center
Touro Infirmary
Tulane Medical Center
University Hospital, New Orleans

Closed hospitals
Charity Hospital
Lindy Boggs Medical Center

Medical education
Louisiana State University Health Sciences Center New Orleans
Tulane University School of Medicine
Xavier University of Louisiana College of Pharmacy
Delgado Community College Allied Health programs

Other organizations
New Orleans Emergency Medical Services

References